Megachile brevis is a species of bee in the family Megachilidae. It was described by Thomas Say in 1837.

References

Brevis
Insects described in 1837